Jemison is a city in Chilton County, Alabama, United States. At the 2020 census, the population was 2,642. The center of population of Alabama is located outside of Jemison, an area known as Jemison Division.

Geography
Jemison is located in northern Chilton County at 32°57'31.792" North, 86°44'36.841" West (32.958831, -86.743567).

History 
Jemison is located at the geological end of the Appalachians and was originally inhabited by the Creek Indians for the springs located in the area. In 1869, R.J. Langston built the first house in area and it was made famous by stagecoach drivers who would stop to rest on their travels between North and South Alabama, calling the area Langston Station, or Langstonville, later known as "Jemison Springs", and finally, Jemison. Population began growing by 1870 after the completion of the railroad passing through the town as part of the L&N Railroad. Construction originally began on the railroad in February 1854, but was halted then destroyed due to the Civil War. 

Responsible for building the segment of track that would run through Langston Station, Col. John T. Milner suggested the name "Jemison" for the area, after the successful Tuscaloosa businessman, Col. Robert Jemison, who based a stagecoach line in Langston Station. Col. Jemison was also responsible for much of the construction of the Alabama-Chattanooga Railroad. in 1870 a post office was established, and the city of Jemison would be incorporated once in 1907, then reincorporated with a new charter in 1919.

Demographics

2020 census

As of the 2020 United States census, there were 2,642 people, 946 households, and 733 families residing in the city.

2010 census
As of the census of 2010, there were 2,585 people, 997 households, and 733 families residing in the city. The racial makeup of the city was 77.8% White, 17.7% Black or African American, 0.1% Native American, 0.1% Asian, 3.1% from other races, and 1.0% from two or more races. 7.0% of the population were Hispanic or Latino of any race.

There were 997 households, out of which 30.5% had children under the age of 18 living with them, 53.0% were married couples living together, 15.1% had a female householder with no husband present, and 26.5% were non-families. 23.3% of all households were made up of individuals, and 9.7% had someone living alone who was 65 years of age or older. The average household size was 2.59 and the average family size was 3.04.

In the city the population was spread out, with 25.2% under the age of 18, 8.0% from 18 to 24, 25.8% from 25 to 44, 26.9% from 45 to 64, and 14.1% who were 65 years of age or older. The median age was 38.7 years. For every 100 females, there were 94.9 males. For every 100 females age 18 and over, there were 94.9 males.

The median income for a household in the city was $40,735, and the median income for a family was $49,091. Males had a median income of $45,082 versus $31,588 for females. The per capita income for the city was $17,300. About 12.8% of families and 15.8% of the population were below the poverty line, including 23.4% of those under age 18 and 6.3% of those age 65 or over.

Schools

Jemison Elementary School
As of 2006, Jemison Elementary School enrollment exceed 900 students, making it the largest school in Chilton County. It ranks scholastically among the best of Alabama's schools. Students are taught from Kindergarten through grade 3 at JES.

Jemison Intermediate School 
Jemison Intermediate School is the newest addition to the Chilton County School System located in Jemison, AL.JIS teaches grades 4-6. Their Mission Statement is to provide a positive and safe learning environment for their students to reach their full academic potential.

Jemison Middle School 
Grades 7 and 8 are taught at Jemison Middle School.

Jemison High School
Jemison High School was built in 1963, where approximately 800 students are enrolled. Grades 8–12 are taught at Jemison High School. The school's mascot is black panther, and their Mission Statement is "to provide a secure, positive and encouraging environment, enabling students to develop essential academic and independent living skills."

Chilton Christian Academy 
Chilton Christian Academy was founded in 1977 by members of the Victory Baptist Church located on HWY 31 in Jemison, AL. It is a faith/religion based, private education institution. The school instructs students from Kindergarten through grade 12, and has a variety of athletic and extra curricular organizations.

Notable people
 Ruby Sales, African-American social activist
 Winston M. Scott, former Central Intelligence Agency officer
 David Wheeler, Alabama state representative
 Reynolds Wolf, meteorologist and journalist

References

External links
 City of Jemison official website
 History of the City of Jemison 
Town of Jemison history and news

Cities in Alabama
Cities in Chilton County, Alabama
Birmingham metropolitan area, Alabama